The Rocket League Championship Series (RLCS) is an annual Rocket League esports tournament series produced by Psyonix, the game's developer. It consists of three online qualification splits in several regions, with teams earning points towards qualifying for midseason tournaments and the RLCS finals, both of which are held as LAN events worldwide.

History
Psyonix had observed the popularity of Rocket League matches on Twitch and other live streaming platforms like YouTube by early 2016 and were looking to use the game more in Esports. In March 2016, Psyonix announced the first Rocket League Championship Series; the finals took place in June 2016 with a 55,000 prize pool. The second season of the championship series took place in December 2016 with a $125,000 prize pool. A third series began in March 2017, with the $300,000 prize pool finals taking place three months later. In this season, two teams from the oceanic region were also invited to compete.

A second division, the Rocket League Rival Series (RLRS), was added in Season 4. The two teams finishing at the bottom of the RLCS and the two teams finishing at the top of the RLRS for each region play each other in a promotion tournament at the end of the season to determine if teams are promoted or relegated. At the advent of Season 5 in June 2018, Psyonix organised and managed the event alone. Previous to this, they partnered with Twitch. Season 6 started in September 2018 and featured a $1,000,000 prize pool. For Season 7, Psyonix introduced South America as a new region. Season 8 took place in December 2019. The Season 9 championship was cancelled due to the COVID-19 pandemic, with winners of the regional championships being considered the champions. In July 2020, Psyonix announced a new format for the tenth season of RLCS, known as RLCS X. This format did away with league play and the RLRS in favor of teams earning points through three regional splits, all culminating in three seasonal majors.

The 2021–22 season began in October 2021, bringing in four new regions (Middle East and North Africa, Asia Pacific North, Asia Pacific South, and Sub-Saharan Africa), a more reliable circuit similar to Season X, and a $6 million prize pool.

For the 2022–23 season Asia Pacific North and Asia Pacific South were combined into a single region with point totals being lower and each regional event being called an Open, Cup and invitational .

Seasons

Notes

References

External links 
 

Championship Series
Recurring sporting events established in 2016